Wolfgang Fischer (27 February 1928 – 25 November 1987) was a German hurdler. He competed in the men's 400 metres hurdles at the 1960 Summer Olympics.

References

1928 births
1987 deaths
Athletes (track and field) at the 1960 Summer Olympics
German male hurdlers
Olympic athletes of the United Team of Germany
Place of birth missing